Kenneth Lee Higgs Jr. (born January 31, 1955) is an American former professional basketball player who played three seasons in the National Basketball Association (NBA) for the Cleveland Cavaliers and Denver Nuggets. He is a 6'0" (183 cm) 180 lb (81.5 kg) point guard and he played collegiately at Louisiana State University.
Higgs was selected by the Cavaliers with the 13th pick in the third round in the 1978 NBA draft. He shares the Southeastern Conference single-game assists record (19: Phil Pressey, 2012–13 Missouri; Bill Hann).

Higgs's best season was in 1980–81 with the 1980–81 Nuggets when he averaged 7.8 points, 2.0 rebounds and 5.7 assists per game.  He also played several seasons in the Continental Basketball Association for the Utica Olympics, Detroit Spirits and Evansville Thunder.

Born in Owensboro, Kentucky, Higgs led Owensboro High School to the 1972 KHSAA Sweet Sixteen State Championship with a 71–63 win over Elizabethtown at Freedom Hall in Louisville, Kentucky.

His brother, Mark Higgs, is a former NFL running back.

Notes

External links
Kenny Higgs NBA stats, basketballreference.com

1955 births
Living people
African-American basketball players
American men's basketball players
Basketball players from Kentucky
Cleveland Cavaliers draft picks
Cleveland Cavaliers players
Denver Nuggets players
Detroit Spirits players
Evansville Thunder players
LSU Tigers basketball players
Parade High School All-Americans (boys' basketball)
Point guards
Sportspeople from Owensboro, Kentucky
Utica Olympics players
21st-century African-American people
20th-century African-American sportspeople